Tomata may refer to:
 Tomata people, a historic ethnic group of South America
 Tomata District, Okayama, in Japan
 Tomata Dam, in Japan
 , a village in North Morowali Regency, Indonesia
 Tomata du Plenty, American singer

See also 
 Tomato (disambiguation)